The 2018 UC Davis football team represented the University of California, Davis as a member of the Big Sky Conference during the 2018 NCAA Division I FCS football season. Led by second-year head coach Dan Hawkins, the Aggies compiled an overall record of 10–3 with a mark of 7–1 in conference play, sharing the Big Sky titlewith Eastern Washington and Weber State. UC Davis received an at-large bid to the NCAA Division I Football Championship playoffs where, after a first round bye, they defeated Northern Iowa in the second round before losing in the quarterfinals to Eastern Washington. The Aggies played home games at Aggie Stadium in Davis, California.

Previous season
The Aggies finished the 2017 season 5–6, 3–5 in Big Sky play to finish in eighth place.

Preseason

Polls
On July 16, 2018, during the Big Sky Kickoff in Spokane, Washington, the Aggies were predicted to finish in ninth place in both the coaches and media poll.

Preseason All-Conference Team
The Aggies had two players selected to the Preseason All-Conference Team.

Keelan Doss – Sr. WR. Also selected as the preseason offensive player of the year.

Wes Preece – Jr. TE

Award watch lists

Schedule

Game summaries

at San Jose State

San Diego

at Stanford

Idaho

at Northern Colorado

Idaho State

at Cal Poly

at Montana

Northern Arizona

at Eastern Washington

vs. Sacramento State

FCS Playoffs

vs. Northern Iowa–Second Round

at Eastern Washington–Quarterfinals

Ranking movements

References

UC Davis
UC Davis Aggies football seasons
Big Sky Conference football champion seasons
UC Davis
UC Davis Aggies football